Field Harris CBE (September 18, 1895 – December 21, 1967) was a highly decorated lieutenant general in the United States Marine Corps, who commanded the Marine Aviation Units during World War II and 1st Marine Aircraft Wing during the Korean War.

Early years

Thomas Field Harris was born on September 18, 1895, in Versailles, Kentucky, the son of Andrew Thomas and Lena Field Harris.

He attended the United States Naval Academy at Annapolis, Maryland, and graduated in 1917. He was subsequently appointed a second lieutenant in the Marine Corps on March 30 of that year.

His first assignment was for a brief period aboard the USS Nevada and subsequently was assigned to the Third Provisional Brigade at Guantánamo Bay, Cuba. Harris stayed in this capacity until April 1919. His next service assignment was at Naval Station Cavite, Philippine Islands, where he participated in the shore patrol duty. Field was transferred back to the United States in June 1922, when he assigned to the Judge Advocate General in Washington, D.C. While there he graduated from George Washington University School of Law. Subsequently, he was assigned to battleship USS Wyoming, where he was appointed a commanding officer of the Marine detachment.

Field later attended the advanced one-year course at Marine Corps Base Quantico and then began flight training at the Naval Air Station Pensacola, Florida. He was designated a Naval Aviator on April 13, 1929. His first duties as a flyer were at Naval Air Station, San Diego, where he served as a commanding officer and executive officer of an aircraft squadron within West Coast Expeditionary Force. Field then attended the course of instructions at Air Corps Tactical School at Langley Field and subsequently served within shore duty in Haiti and sea duty aboard the aircraft carrier USS Lexington. Field's next service assignment was at Headquarters Marine Corps in Washington, D.C., where he served in the aviation section. He also attended the Naval War College at Newport, Rhode Island, where he graduated from the Senior course in May 1939.

World War II 

At the beginning of the War, Field served still in Cairo, Egypt, as assistant naval attaché. He had the opportunity to study the Royal Air Force's support of Britain's Eighth Army in its desert operations. After that, he went to the South Pacific and was chief of staff, aircraft, on Guadalcanal.

Korean War and retirement
Major General Harris was commanding general of 1st Marine Aircraft Wing during the Korean War. His son, Lieutenant Colonel William Frederick Harris, USMC, was lost on December 7, 1950, in the breakout at the Battle of Chosin Reservoir. General Harris retired July 1953 and subsequently worked as librarian for the Kentucky State Law Library.

General Harris died in 1967. He was buried at Pisgah Presbyterian Church Cemetery, near Versailles, KY.

Decorations 

Here is the ribbon bar of Lieutenant General Field Harris:

References

1895 births
1967 deaths
United States Marine Corps generals
United States Naval Aviators
United States Marine Corps personnel of World War I
United States Marine Corps personnel of the Korean War
United States Marine Corps World War II generals
Recipients of the Navy Distinguished Service Medal
Recipients of the Distinguished Service Medal (US Army)
Recipients of the Legion of Merit
Recipients of the Air Medal
Commanders of the Order of the British Empire
United States Naval Academy alumni
Naval War College alumni
People from Versailles, Kentucky